The Bangladesh women's national cricket team represents Bangladesh in international women's cricket. A full member of the International Cricket Council (ICC), the team is governed by the Bangladesh Cricket Board (BCB).

On 24 November 2011, Bangladesh was granted one-day status after defeating USA by nine wickets in the 2011 Women's Cricket World Cup Qualifier at Dhaka. That win guaranteed that Bangladesh would finish in the top six in the tournament and thus be ranked in the top ten globally, which was the requirement for attaining one-day status.
Bangladesh played their first Women's One Day International cricket (WODI) match in that same tournament against Ireland on 26 November 2011; Bangladesh won the match by 82 runs to secure their first win in this format. It was also the first international match for Bangladesh's women's team. Bangladesh had to wait until 2016 to get their first overseas win in this format when they beat Ireland by ten runs in the third and final ODI. As the first two matches of the series got washed out, that win in the last ODI marked the first overseas bilateral series win for Bangladesh in this format. However Bangladesh's first bilateral series win came against Pakistan in 2014 when they made a clean sweep over Pakistan in a two match series.
, Bangladesh have played 38 WODI matches, winning 9 and  losing 27 (2 matches had no result).

The Bangladesh women's national cricket team first competed in Women's Twenty20 International (WT20I) cricket on 28 August 2012 when they played Ireland in the first match of a Twenty20 tri-nation series in Dublin. They recorded their first victory in that match beating the Irish side by 4 wickets.
The Bangladeshi side would have debuted in the Twenty20 international arena the previous day as they were scheduled to play Pakistan at the same venue, but that one-off match was abandoned without a ball being bowled. Bangladesh won their first Twenty20 at home against South Africa in the first match of a three match Twenty20 international series in 2012, winning the rain-shortened match by seven wickets. Bangladesh secured their first bilateral T20I series win against Ireland in June 2018, taking the three match series 2–1. The same month the Bangladeshi side won their first multi-team international tournament with victory in the 2018 Asia Cup, denying India a straight seventh title; it was the first time that a Bangladeshi cricket team had won a multi-team international tournament in any version of the game.
, they have played 75 WT20I matches and won 27 of them; 48 were lost.

, Bangladesh, alongside Afghanistan and Zimbabwe, is one of the three full members of ICC that is yet to feature in a women's test cricket.

Bangladesh have faced five teams in Women's ODI cricket, with their most frequent opponent being South Africa, against whom they have played 17 matches. Bangladesh have registered more wins against Pakistan than against any other team, with four. In Women's T20I matches, Bangladesh have played against 18 teams. They have played against Pakistan most frequently in ODI matches. Bangladesh have defeated Ireland in 6 matches, which is their best record in T20Is. Bangladesh have a 100% winning record against four opponents (Scotland, Thailand, Netherlands and Papua New Guinea)  that they have encountered in more than one match.

, like their male counterparts, the Bangladeshi women's side has not been involved in any tied international matches.

Key

One Day International

Twenty20 International

Notes

References

External links 
 Bangladesh Women ODI Cricket Stats in ESPNCricinfo
 Bangladesh Women T20I Cricket Stats in ESPNCricinfo
 Bangladesh Cricket Board Official Website

Lists of Bangladeshi cricket records and statistics
Cricket records and statistics
Bangladesh women's national cricket team